Steffen Hofmann (born 9 September 1980) is a German football coach and a former player, who played most of his career for SK Rapid Wien of the Austrian Bundesliga. He played as an attacking midfielder. He works as a sports coordinator for Rapid Wien.

Club career
In his early years, Hofmann played for the youth team of his home town Würzburg before joining the Bayern Munich Junior Team in 1997. After leading the team to a championship and a runner-up finish in the German Youth Leagues, he was promoted to the second team of Bayern Munich in 2000. After scoring 12 goals in 36 games for the second team, he got a chance to play for Bayern Munich's first team on 27 October 2001 in their game against 1. FC Köln, coming on as a substitute for Claudio Pizarro in the 90th minute. This was his only game for the first team.

In 2002, Hofmann joined the Austrian team SK Rapid Wien and quickly became a fan favourite. He also formed the league's best midfield duo along with Andreas Ivanschitz and the two led the team to its 31st league championship in 2005 and to the group stage of the UEFA Champions League in 2006. After finishing last in their group and the transfer of his teammate Ivanschitz, Hofmann decided to join the German club TSV 1860 Munich in January 2006, but after desperately trying to find his form there, he returned to Rapid Wien in the summer.

Following his return Hofmann got injured in the first game of the season and therefore missed half the season. His comeback came in late October and he has since then been one of the key players and the captain of Rapid Wien. He is also called "football god" by the fans because of his technical skills, his commitment and his endurance (he did not miss a minute of the 2008 season). Hofmann is also known as a player who rather passes the ball to a better positioned player than having a shoot at goal.

On 21 October 2010, he netted the second goal to help his side to a 2–0 away win against Bulgarian club CSKA Sofia in a UEFA Europa League match.

Hoffman retired during 2018, and a testimonial match was played in his honour between SK Rapid and a "Steffen Hofmann & Friends" XI.

International career
The Austrian Football Association tried in 2005 to let Hofmann, who was born in Germany but is married to an Austrian, to play for the Austria national football team. Hofmann agreed, but the transfer of rights was refused by FIFA as Hofmann had played several games for Germany in his youth. After the episode, Hofmann did not attain Austrian citizenship and was chosen to represent Germany during the team's Asian tour in late 2005. However, due to illness he could not take part and has not been nominated since despite declaring interest.

Trivia
Hofmann was never sent off in his entire professional career.

Career statistics

Honours
Bayern Munich
 German B-youth Championship: 1997

Rapid Wien
 Austrian Football Bundesliga: 2004–05, 2007–08
 Intertoto Cup: 2007

Individual
 Austrian Footballer of the Year: 2004, 2009
 Krone Footballer of the Year (voted by fans): 2006, 2007
 Austrian Football Bundesliga top scorer: 2009–10 (20 goals)

References

External links 
 

1980 births
Living people
Sportspeople from Würzburg
German footballers
Footballers from Bavaria
Association football midfielders
Germany B international footballers
Germany youth international footballers
FC Bayern Munich footballers
FC Bayern Munich II players
TSV 1860 Munich players
SK Rapid Wien players
SK Rapid Wien managers
Bundesliga players
2. Bundesliga players
Regionalliga players
Austrian Football Bundesliga players
German football managers
German expatriate footballers
German expatriate football managers
German expatriate sportspeople in Austria
Expatriate footballers in Austria
Expatriate football managers in Austria